Surena is a series of Iranian humanoid robots, named after the Parthian General Surena. The Institute of Electrical and Electronics Engineers (IEEE) has placed the Surena among the prominent robots in the world after analyzing its performance.

SURENA I (Surena 1) 

SURENA I project was built at the Center for Advanced Vehicles (CAV), University of Tehran, with financial support from the R&D Society of Iranian Industries and Mines. SURENA's height and weight is 1.65 metres and 60 kilograms. They could synthesize speech in Persian, move along paths and play a basic version of football. SURENA was developed to demonstrate the University's capability in human robotics.

SURENA II (Surena 2) 

The SURENA II humanoid robot project began in 2008 at the same Center and funders. It was finished on July 3, 2010. SURENA II was capable of more independent walking, as well as performing simple demonstrations. SURENA II is 1.45 metres tall and had 22 degrees of freedom in total. After the public unveiling, the robot went on an international media tour.

SURENA III (Surena 3) 

The next iteration of Surena was funded by the Industrial Development and Renovation Organization (IDRO) of Iran and built by a team of 70 at the University of Tehran. Its increased degrees of freedom (31) came with a higher weight of 98 kg and 1.98 metre height, as well as improvements in maneuverability, speed and intelligence. SURENA III implemented new sensor and motor control systems, as well as some artificial intelligence.

SURENA IV (Surena 4) 

On December 14, 2019, the fourth generation of Surena humanoid robot was officially unveiled. The robot has been developed in CAST (Center of Advanced Systems and Technologies) by more than 50 researchers under the supervision of Dr. Aghil Yousefi-Koma, Professor of Mechanical Engineering at the University of Tehran. The performance included both upper and lower body motions, interaction with a host and speech. The project is funded by the presidential deputy for science and technology and is considered as the symbol of technological advancement in the direction of peace and humanity with the goal of designing an appropriate research platform, more developed than previous versions.

The first and simplest version of the robot (SURENA I, 2008) had only 8 degrees of freedom (DoF) and the second one (SURENA II, 2010) had 22 DoF with a walking speed of 0.03 meters per second. Compared to the third generation (SURENA III, 2015) which had 31 DoF, the new adult-sized Humanoid robot has 43 DoF and higher dexterity in the hands, making it able to grip different objects with different shapes. SURENA IV is 1.7 meters tall and has a mass of 68 kilograms; it is much lighter and smaller than SURENA III (98 kilograms and 1.9 meters tall) due to the better structure design based on topology optimization, compact customized actuator design, and the SLA 3D printing technology used for its cover.
 
In the new generation, the control loop frequency has been increased to 200 Hz by exploiting FPGA board, making it possible to implement online controllers and estimators. By the means of Robot Operation System (ROS), state monitoring, real time implementation of algorithms, and simultaneous running of several programs have become straightforward.

Improving the robot- interaction with the environment was one of the main goals in the SURENA IV project. The robot has the abilities of face detection and counting, object detection and position measurement, activity detection, speech recognition (speech to text) and speech generation (text to speech), resulting to achieve better voice user interface. Online grip, face and object follow, and action imitation have been implemented by combining AI abilities and whole-body motion planning.

While the mean speed of SURENA III was 0.3 kilometers per hour, SURENA IV can walk continuously with a speed of 0.7 kilometers per hour, thanks to the dynamic motion of its center of mass and online controllers. The robot can walk on uneven terrain using novel contact sensors in its sole. Researchers at CAST have developed online contact controllers to adjust the angle and position of foot during stepping. Gazebo, Choreonoid, and MATLAB have been used to simulate the motion of the robot and evaluate different scenarios including upper body and lower body motions (e.g. side walking, backward walking, turning around, and push recovery).

Videos

Surena 4 Official Video
Surena 3 Video by IEEE

See also
Science and technology in Iran
Humanoid robot
CAST (Center of Advanced Systems and Technologies)

References

External links
 SURENA Humanoid Robot ENG Website
 SURENA Humanoid Robot Persian Website
 CAST Official Website (eng)
 CAST Official Website (persian)
Iran Demonstrates New Humanoid Robot Surena III

Bipedal humanoid robots
2008 robots
Robots of Iran